A (hiragana: あ, katakana: ア) is a Japanese kana that represents the mora consisting of single vowel . The hiragana character あ is based on the sōsho style of kanji , while the katakana ア is from the radical of kanji .  In the modern Japanese system of alphabetical order, it occupies the first position of the alphabet, before い. Additionally, it is the 36th letter in Iroha, after て, before さ.  The Unicode for あ is U+3042, and the Unicode for ア is U+30A2.

Derivation
The katakana ア derives, via man'yōgana, from the left element of kanji . The hiragana あ derives from cursive simplification of the kanji .

Variant forms
Scaled-down versions of the kana (ぁ, ァ) are used to express sounds foreign to the Japanese language, such as ファ (fa). In some Okinawan writing systems, a small ぁ is also combined with the kana く (ku) and ふ (fu or hu) to form the digraphs くぁ kwa and ふぁ hwa, although others use a small ゎ instead. In hentaigana, a variant of あ is appeared with a stroke written exactly as wakanmuri.  The version of the kana with dakuten (あ゙, ア゙) are used to represent either a gurgling sound, a voiced pharyngeal fricative, or other similarly articulated sound.

Stroke order

The Hiragana あ is made with three strokes:
At the top, a horizontal stroke from left to right.
A downward vertical stroke starting above and in the center of the last stroke.
At the bottom, a loop like the Hiragana の.

The Katakana ア is made with two strokes:
At the top, a stroke consisting of a horizontal line and a short horizontal line proceeding downward and to the left.
Starting at the end of the last stroke, a curved line proceeding downward and to the left.

Other communicative representations

 Full Braille representation

 When lengthening "-a" syllables in Japanese braille, a chōon is always used, as in standard katakana usage instead of adding an あ / ア.

 Computer encodings

Footnotes

References

 

Specific kana